Anıl Piyancı (born 17 July 1990) is a Turkish rapper, musician and songwriter.

Career 
He started his career at the age of 16 by founding his studio "Yeşil Oda". Piyancı started making hip hop music in 2010 and was featured in Ezhel's song Sekiz in 2011. His breakthrough came in May 2014 with the song Bi Duman Hip-Hop which was published on YouTube. The song was well received by the audience and soon products and T-shirts branded with the song's title were produced and sold.

In 2019, he voiced an acoustic version of the song "Bırakman Doğru mu?" together with Zeynep Bastık. The song was among the most-listened songs on Spotify in Turkey in 2019. In the same year, he prepared a number of songs for different commercials. In 2020, he was given the Best Debut by a Rapper award at the Stars of Music Awards, which is organized by MüzikOnAir and Bahçeşehir University Radio. In the same year, he signed a contract with Universal Müzik Production.

Discography

Albums

Singles

EPs

References

External links 
 
 
 Anıl Piyancı on Spotify
 

1990 births
People from Karşıyaka
Living people
Turkish rappers
Turkish lyricists
Turkish songwriters